is a Japanese singer, actress and model. Her music ranges from pop, rock to R&B. She resides in Osaka, and is signed with Tokyo-based AVEX recording label. She is the vocalist of the rock band Uroboros and the rock duo Sonic Lover Reckless with Lovebites guitarist Miyako.

Biography
Kamiki learned to play the piano when she was 4 years old. In junior high school, she began singing live. Influenced by punk rock, she also learned how to play the guitar.

In 2005, Kamiki released her two mini-albums "Constellation" and "Rock On" from the independent record label Weed Records.  Kamiki's singing career was mainly active in Osaka, where she garnered positive results. Her voice was so full of force that it was part of her reputation. She made appearances in music and fashion magazines, which caught people's attention.

In 2006, Kamiki signed on with Giza Studio and released her first major label single "Communication Break" on March 15. On April 12, her second single "Pierrot" was released. The song was respectively written and composed by B'z members Koshi Inaba and Tak Matsumoto, although the lyrics in Kamiki's version were slightly modified. It was released on the same day as the B'z single "ゆるぎないものひとつ" (Yuruginaimono Hitotsu), which contained "Pierrot" as its 2nd Beat (B-side). The single reached 9th place on the Oricon charts. Her third single "Mou Kimidake-wo Hanashitari-wa Shinai" peaked at the 11th place, and her first full album "Secret Code" debuted at 5th place. In order to promote Secret Code's release, Kamiki held two mini-concerts. One was as "Black Kamiki" and was performed at Tower Records in Shibuya. The other (later on the same day), was as "White Aya" and was performed at HMV in Shibuya. Entrance was free, provided that you had purchased Secret Code at the corresponding store.

Early 2007, Kamiki was one of the winners of the 21st Japan Gold Disc Award's New Artist of the Year.  In 2009, she moved the Avex Trax label and before leaving Ginza Studio, she released a best album titled, "Greatest Best" and she released her 12th single named "WBX (W-Boiled Extreme)" on November 11.

She makes an appearance as an in-game character in the 2008 visual novel 428: Shibuya Scramble (later released internationally in 2018). She also sang its theme song "Sekai wa Sore Demo Kawari wa Shinai" (世界はそれでも変わりはしない), known in English as "The World Doesn't Change So Easy", which was released as a single in December 2008.

In 2010, her fourth album, Individual Emotion, was released on January 27, and one track, "The Light" was released as a PV. Then on July 14, her 13th single, "Revolver" was released, then shortly after on August 11, she released her mini-album, "Gloriosa".

Discography

Albums

Studio albums

Compilation albums

Video albums

Extended plays

Singles

UNREAL and V/S singles were sold during live concerts; the title songs can be downloaded via iTunes.

Notes

References

External links
Aya Kamiki official GIZA studio site

Japanese women pop singers
1985 births
Living people
Musicians from Sapporo
Avex Group artists
Being Inc. artists
21st-century Japanese singers
21st-century Japanese women singers